Marcello Giorda (1890–1960) was an Italian film actor.

Selected filmography
 Adam's Tree (1936)
 The Last Days of Pompeo (1937)
 The Two Misanthropists (1937)
 Scipio Africanus: The Defeat of Hannibal (1937)
 Don Pasquale (1940)
 Beatrice Cenci (1941)
 The Adventures of Fra Diavolo (1942)
 Rita of Cascia (1943)
 The White Angel (1943)
 Hotel Luna, Room 34 (1946)
 Crossroads of Passion (1948)
 Hand of Death (1949)
 Lorenzaccio (1951)
 Ha da venì... don Calogero! (1952)
 Processo contro ignoti (1952)
 A Parisian in Rome (1954)
 The King's Prisoner (1954)
 Escape to the Dolomites (1955)
 Il marito (1957)
 The Great War (1959)

References

Bibliography
 Goble, Alan. The Complete Index to Literary Sources in Film. Walter de Gruyter, 1999.

External links

1890 births
1960 deaths
Italian male film actors
Male actors from Rome